LaSalle County is located within the Fox Valley and Illinois River Valley regions of the U.S. state of Illinois. As of the 2020 Census, it had a population of 109,658. Its county seat and largest city is Ottawa. LaSalle County is part of the Ottawa, IL Micropolitan Statistical Area of Northern Illinois.

LaSalle County borders Woodford, Marshall, Putnam, Bureau, Livingston, Lee, DeKalb, Kendall, and Grundy counties. Though LaSalle County is in the Chicago media market, it retains a unique identity with a mix of river towns and vast expanses of farmland.

History
LaSalle County was formed on January 15, 1831, out of Tazewell and Putnam Counties. It is named for the early French explorer René-Robert Cavelier, Sieur de La Salle.  La Salle was the first European recorded as entering the area.  He traveled the Mississippi River upriver from the Gulf of Mexico, claimed the land for France, or rather as a possession of King Louis XIV of France, and named it Louisiana. In 1680, he and Henry de Tonty built Fort Crevecoeur on the Illinois River in present-day Tazewell County, and in 1683, they constructed Fort St. Louis on Starved Rock in present-day LaSalle County. By 1857, the county was served by the daily arrivals of two trains of the Illinois Central Railroad.

As William D. Boyce reportedly founded the Boy Scouts of America in Ottawa, the Council is named for him.  He and two other founders established the BSA, but Boyce is given the sole credit since his faction of the BSA adopted the other two competing factions' elements within the organization.  LaSalle County is within what is called the Lowaneu District of the W.D. Boyce Council.

In 1838, William Reddick, a local farmer and landowner, was elected sheriff of LaSalle County. He was hired to restore public order resulting from an influx of workmen creating the Illinois and Michigan Canal. Reddick served as sheriff for four consecutive two-year terms. After being elected to the Illinois State Senate, Reddick commissioned the construction of a luxurious Italianate home, now known as the Reddick Mansion. This structure is one of the largest surviving pre-Civil War homes in Illinois. The mansion was added to the National Register of Historic Places in 1973, as part of the Washington Park Historic District.

The tri-county area of DeKalb, LaSalle, and Kendall has been influential in terms of its political, sports, multimedia, industry, and technology. DeKalb County was the birthplace of plant hybridization (DeKalb, DeKalb Agricultural), the hot-air hand dryer (Sandwich, Sahara-Pak), and is the home of supermodel Cindy Crawford, at least 7 MLB players, two NFL coaches, and three NFL players.  LaSalle County was home to the Westclox Company for many years, it was the site of the first Lincoln-Douglas Debates, and was the home to the discoverer of Pluto, as well as a Wild West figure, multiple published authors, a legendary NCAA athletic director and coach, and multiple political figures.  Kendall County is the home to a seminal piece of 20th Century architecture, the birthplace of the Harvester Reaper, (as well as the precursor to the International Harvester Company), the plastic tackle box and plastic-injection molding, and is the home of multiple athletes, politicians, and a former Speaker of the House of Representatives.  DeKalb, LaSalle, and Kendall Counties have all been featured in major films, with scripts either having been written by residents or former residents.

La Salle County was founded largely by immigrants from New England.  These were old stock Yankee immigrants, who were descended from the English Puritans who settled New England in the 1600s.  The completion of the Erie Canal caused a surge in New England immigration to what was then the Northwest Territory.  The end of the Black Hawk War led to an additional surge of immigration, once again coming almost exclusively from the six New England states as a result of overpopulation combined with land shortages in that region.  Some of these later settlers were from upstate New York and had parents who had moved to that region from New England shortly after the Revolutionary War. New Englanders and New England transplants from upstate New York were the vast majority of La Salle County's inhabitants during the first several decades of its history.  These settlers were primarily members of the Congregational Church, though due to the Second Great Awakening, many of them had converted to Methodism, and some had become Baptists before coming to what is now La Salle County.  The Congregational Church has subsequently gone through many divisions, and some factions, including those in La Salle County, are now known as the Church of Christ and the United Church of Christ.  As a result of this heritage, the vast majority of inhabitants in La Salle County − much like antebellum New England − were overwhelmingly in favor of the abolitionist movement during the decades leading up to the Civil War.  When the New Englanders arrived in what is now La Salle County, there was nothing but dense virgin forest and wild prairie. They laid out farms, constructed roads, erected government buildings and established post routes.  In 1834, Norwegian immigrants settled in the northwest corner of the county.  The construction of the Illinois & Michigan Canal brought thousands of Irish and Irish-American workers to Illinois. Many settled in the counties along the canal route. Ottawa and LaSalle County had a large Irish population due to the importance of Ottawa as a trade and industrial center on the canal. The election of the LaSalle County sheriff hinged on the Irish vote when a New Englander Woodruff was replaced as sheriff by William Reddick a successful Irish landowner following Woodruff's role in putting down a riot along the canal in 1837. Irish and German immigration to LaSalle County, especially LaSalle. Ottawa and Peru prior to the Civil War was such that many German immigrants joined Illinois regiments during the war. In the late 1880s and early 1890s, Irish and German migrants began moving into La Salle County; most of these later immigrants did not move directly from Ireland and Germany, but rather from other areas in the Midwest where they had been living, particularly the state of Ohio.  Immigrants around the Peterstown, Troy Grove, Meriden, Mendota, and Earlville area were largely of German descent, with the Mendota area directly being the epicenter of the German community in the county.  Norwegian population has been strong in the area around Northville, Serena, Mission, and Miller Townships in LaSalle County, along with Little Rock and Fox Townships in Kendall County, and Sandwich and Somonauk Townships in DeKalb County.  One such family, the Borschsenius family, runs the Norway Store in the unincorporated community of Norway, in southern Mission Township, and the family has been deeply involved with businesses and the school district of nearby Serena and Sheridan.

Ottawa was the first site of the famous Lincoln–Douglas debates on August 21, 1858.  The community has a strong association with the 16th President, and elements of the downtown area of the city retain much mid-19th century architecture. People in LaSalle County were predominantly abolitionist in attitude, and many Underground Railroad sites were maintained in the county prior to the American Civil War.

Utica (officially North Utica) is considered the gateway to the Starved Rock area.  Visiting three parks provides a full experience of the area. Starved Rock State Park, (south of Utica on Illinois Route 178), is the crown jewel. Matthiessen State Park (south of Starved Rock on Ill 178) has many of the same features of Starved Rock, but is smaller, and faces the Vermilion River to the west. Buffalo Rock State Park (east of Utica, and west of Naplate/Ottawa on Dee Bennett Road) has an enclosure which features American bison, as well as the mound sculpture complex, known as the Effigy Tumuli. The village was the site of a F3 tornado that ripped through the downtown and killed nine people on April 20, 2004.

Geography
It is the second-largest county in Illinois by land area and the fourth-largest by total area.

Adjacent counties

 Lee County northwest
 DeKalb County north
 Kendall County northeast
 Livingston County southeast
 Woodford County south
 Marshall County southwest
 Putnam County west
 Bureau County west

LaSalle County, Illinois, is one of the few counties in the United States to border as many as nine counties. Illinois has two such counties, with Pike County being the other.

Many of the residents of LaSalle County live in cities and towns along the Illinois River.  It is the main population core, with some exceptions, including Streator to the south of the county.  Large cities along the river include Ottawa, LaSalle, Peru, and Marseilles.  The regions north and south of the Illinois River are mostly agricultural, including the Fox River portion of the county, and have few large towns.

Climate 

Demographics

As of the 2020 United States Census, there were 109,658 people, 45,089 households, and 29,344 families residing in the county. The racial makeup of the county was 85.6% white, 2.4% black or African American, 0.8% Asian, 0.4% American Indian, 3.6% from other races, and 7.2% from two or more races. Those of Hispanic or Latino origin made up 10.4% of the population. In terms of ancestry, 27.8% were German, 18.0% were Irish, 8.7% were Italian, 8.1% were English, 7.6% were Polish, 4.4% were Norwegian, 3.8% were American, and 3.1% were French.

Of the 45,089 households, 26.1% had children under the age of 18 living with them, 48.6% were married couples living together, 11.7% had a female householder with no husband present, 34.9% were non-families, and 29.5% of all households were made up of individuals. The average household size was 2.34 and the average family size was 2.86. The median age was 42.1 years. For every 100 females there were 101.4 males.

The median income for a household in the county was $60,069 and the median income for a family was $72,583. Males had a median income of $50,214 versus $26,424 for females. The per capita income for the county was $31,020. About 9.7% of families and 13.6% of the population were below the poverty line, including 21.8% of those under age 18 and 5.2% of those age 65 or over.

Education

School districts

Secondary schools

Public
 Earlville High School (CUSD 9), also has district area in DeKalb and Lee Counties
 LaSalle-Peru High School, LaSalle
 Leland High School, Leland, also has district area in DeKalb County
 Mendota Township High School, Mendota, also has district area in Bureau and Lee Counties
 Newark Community High School, located within Kendall County, but serves Mission Township
 Ottawa Township High School, Ottawa
 Sandwich Community High School (CUSD 430), located within DeKalb County, but serves Northville Township
 Seneca High School, also has district area in Grundy County
 Serena High School (CUSD 2)
 Somonauk High School, located within DeKalb County, but serves Northville and Adams Townships
 Streator Township High School, Streator
 Woodland High School, Streator

Private
 Marquette Academy, Ottawa
 Ottawa Christian Academy, Ottawa
 St. Bede Academy, Peru

Colleges and universities
 Illinois Valley Community College, Oglesby

Infrastructure

Transportation

Transit
 Mendota station
 List of intercity bus stops in Illinois

Airports
 Earlville Airport, closed in 2010
 Illinois Valley Regional Airport, Peru

Major highways

  Interstate 39
  Interstate 80
  U.S. Highway 6
  U.S. Highway 34
  U.S. Highway 51
  U.S. Highway 52
  Illinois Route 17
  Illinois Route 18
  Illinois Route 23
  Illinois Route 71
  Illinois Route 170
  Illinois Route 178
  Illinois Route 251
  Illinois Route 351

Utilities
 LaSalle County Nuclear Generating Station, Marseilles

Communities

Cities

 Earlville
 LaSalle
 Marseilles
 Mendota
 Oglesby
 Ottawa
 Peru
 Sandwich (part)
 Streator (part)
 Wenona (part)

Villages

 Cedar Point
 Dalzell (part)
 Dana
 Grand Ridge
 Kangley
 Leland
 Leonore
 Lostant
 Millington (part)
 Naplate
 North Utica
 Ransom
 Rutland
 Seneca (part)
 Sheridan
 Somonauk (part)
 Tonica
 Troy Grove

Census-designated places
 Dayton
 Lake Holiday

Other unincorporated communities

 Altmar
 Baker
 Blakes
 Catharine
 Danway
 Dimmick
 Farm Ridge
 Fitchmoor
 Garfield
 Harding
 Hitt
 Jonesville
 Kernan
 Leeds
 Lowell
 Meriden
 Milla
 Mount Palatine (part)
 Northville
 Norway
 Peterstown
 Prairie Center
 Richards
 Science
 Serena
 Stavanger
 Sulphur Springs
 Ticona
 Triumph
 Waltham
 Wedron
 Welland (part)
 Wilsman

Townships
LaSalle County is divided into thirty-seven townships:

 Adams
 Allen
 Brookfield
 Bruce
 Dayton
 Deer Park
 Dimmick
 Eagle
 Earl
 Eden
 Fall River
 Farm Ridge
 Freedom
 Grand Rapids
 Groveland
 Hope
 LaSalle
 Manlius
 Mendota
 Meriden
 Miller
 Mission
 Northville
 Ophir
 Osage
 Ottawa
 Otter Creek
 Peru
 Richland
 Rutland
 Serena
 South Ottawa
 Troy Grove
 Utica
 Vermillion
 Wallace
 Waltham

Ghost towns
 East Wenona
 Little Rock
 Science

Politics

LaSalle has generally been a Republican-leaning swing county, more competitive than most in urbanized Northern Illinois.

In its early years, LaSalle County supported the Democratic Party, being southwest of the Free Soil strongholds in the far northeast of the state. Following the formation of the Republican party, LaSalle County voted for that party in every election until 1884, when it supported Democrat Grover Cleveland three consecutive times. Although the county gave a plurality to Woodrow Wilson in 1912 and supported Franklin D. Roosevelt in his first three elections, it otherwise voted Republican until 1960.

A Democratic trend, typical of Yankee Northern Illinois, saw Michael Dukakis carry LaSalle despite failing to win the election in 1988, and no Republican would carry the county again until George W. Bush in 2004.

Visitor attractions
 Hegeler Carus Mansion
 Hopalong Cassidy River Trail
 Illini State Park
 Kaskaskia Alliance Trail
 LaSalle Lake State Fish and Wildlife Area
 Middle East Conflicts Wall Memorial
 Mitchell's Grove Nature Preserve
 Ottawa Avenue Cemetery
 Plum Island Eagle Sanctuary
 Washington Park Historic District (Ottawa, Illinois)
 Wild Bill Hickok Memorial

Notable people 

 James T. Aubrey (LaSalle) longtime president of CBS Television network
 Bill Brown, (Mendota) former running back for the Minnesota Vikings
 Herbert "Fritz" Crisler, (Earlville, Mendota) head football coach at the University of Michigan (1938–1947), namesake of the school's basketball stadium, and is credited for created the helmet design for the Michigan football team
 Doug Dieken, (rural Streator) former tackle with the Cleveland Browns (1971–1984); color commentary for Browns radio broadcasts
 Walter T. Gunn, Illinois Supreme Court justice, born in LaSalle County
 J. A. Happ, (Peru) pitcher for New York Yankees; pitched for 2008 World Series champion Philadelphia Phillies
 Michael Hermosillo, (Ottawa) outfielder for the Los Angeles Angels and minor league affiliates
 Wild Bill Hickok, (Troy Grove) noted historical Western Figure
 Helen Hokinson, (Mendota) cartoonist for The New Yorker
 Silas Johnson, (Sheridan) credited as the last pitcher to strike out Herman "Babe" Ruth; played for the Cincinnati Reds
 Harry Kelly, (Ottawa) 39th governor of Michigan
 Terrence Malick, (Ottawa) film director, known for Badlands and The Thin Red Line; born in Ottawa
 Bob McGrath, (Ottawa), Sesame Street performer
 Esther Hobart Morris, (Peru) First Female Judge in United States
 Clarence E. Mulford, (Streator) wrote the "Hopalong Cassidy" cowboy novels
 Cleng Peerson, established the community of Norway
 Edward H. Plumb, (Streator) film composer, worked with Walt Disney on Fantasia; nominated four times for an Academy Award
 Maud Powell, (Peru) violinist
 Thomas E. G. Ransom, Civil War general, lived in Peru, namesake of Ransom
 Adam Shabala, (Streator) former outfielder for the San Francisco Giants
 Aaron Shea, (Ottawa) player for the Cleveland Browns
 Clyde Tombaugh, (Streator) astronomer, discovered Pluto
 Martin R. M. Wallace, (Ottawa) Civil War general
 W.H.L. Wallace, (Ottawa) Civil War general
 Walt Willey, (Ottawa) actor, known for All My Children
 Gary K. Wolf, (Earlville) author of Who Censored Roger Rabbit?, adopted into the movie Who Framed Roger Rabbit
 Clay Zavada, (Streator) pitcher for the Arizona Diamondbacks

See also
 National Register of Historic Places listings in LaSalle County, Illinois
 Sandwich Fault Zone

Notes

References

External links

 
 La Salle County, Il Biographical Sketches
 LaSalle County Tourism

 
1831 establishments in Illinois
Illinois counties
Ottawa, IL Micropolitan Statistical Area
Populated places established in 1831
Populated places on the Underground Railroad